Ice on Fire is the nineteenth studio album by English musician Elton John. Recorded at Sol Studios and released in November 1985, it was his first album since Blue Moves produced by his original long-time producer, Gus Dudgeon. David Paton and Charlie Morgan appear for the first time on bass and drums respectively, replacing original band members Dee Murray and Nigel Olsson. Fred Mandel, who had played with John during the Breaking Hearts tour, also contributed guitar and keyboards.

The album was met with little praise and only reached #48 on the US charts, although it reached #3 in the UK. "Nikita" and "Wrap Her Up" became top 20 hits. The latter reached #20 in the US, and the former reached #7 in the US and #3 in the UK. In the US, the album was certified gold in June 1986 by the RIAA.

Background
The title of the album contains a line from the lyrics of "Nikita". "With eyes that looked like ice on fire" 

Guests on the recording include Nik Kershaw; Sister Sledge; Pino Palladino; Mel Gaynor and Millie Jackson, who duetted with John on "Act of War"; George Michael, then of Wham!, who appears on "Nikita" and "Wrap Her Up"; and Roger Taylor and John Deacon of Queen who play drums and bass guitar on "Too Young".

According to Elizabeth Rosenthal in her book, His Songs: The Musical Journey of Elton John (p. 260; First edition), the LP's closing track, "Shoot Down the Moon", was considered for the James Bond film A View to a Kill, but the producers instead decided to go with the title track as performed by Duran Duran.

Track listing

 Sides one and two were combined as tracks 1–10 on CD reissues.

Notes
The remastered 1999 version did not include "Act of War"; the 1999 remaster had a longer intro to "Satellite" than the LP and the 1985 CD issue, and has a slightly different vocal mix. The live version of "Sorry Seems to Be the Hardest Word" is not the version found on the 12" single of "Nikita", but is an unreleased version from 1977 (Live at Rainbow Rock in May). It is unknown why the switch occurred. The other two live tracks were recorded at Wembley Stadium during the tour for the album Breaking Hearts.
"The Man Who Never Died" is a song written about John Lennon, in addition to "Empty Garden (Hey Hey Johnny)", from Elton John's album Jump Up!

Personnel 
Track numbering refers to CD and digital releases of the album.

 Elton John – lead vocals, acoustic piano (1–3, 5, 8, 10, 11), Yamaha GS1 piano (4, 5), synthesizer (4, 7, 9, 11), backing vocals (4)
 Fred Mandel – synthesizers (1, 4, 5, 10, 11), keyboards (2, 3, 6–9), sequencer (6), electric guitar (7, 11), finger snaps (7), arrangements (10)
 Davey Johnstone – electric guitar (1, 3, 5, 6, 8, 9, 11), Spanish guitar (2), synth guitar (2, 7), backing vocals (3, 5, 6–9)
 Nik Kershaw – electric guitar (4, 7, 11), backing vocals (4)
 Paul Westwood – bass (1, 2, 6)
 Deon Estus – bass (3, 7, 11)
 David Paton – bass (4, 8, 9)
 John Deacon – bass (5)
 Pino Palladino – bass (10)
 Charlie Morgan – drums (1, 2, 6)
 Mel Gaynor – drums (3, 7, 11)
 Dave Mattacks – drums (4, 8, 9), military snare (5)
 Roger Taylor – drums (5)
 Frank Ricotti – percussion (3, 5), vibraphone (9)
 James Newton Howard – string arrangements (3, 6)
 Gus Dudgeon – horn arrangements (3, 6), Simmons drums (5, 11), arrangements (10)
 David Bitelli – horn arrangements (1, 3, 6, 9), baritone saxophone (1, 6, 9), tenor saxophone (3, 6)
 Bob Sydor – tenor saxophone (3)
 Phil Todd – alto saxophone (6)
 Nick Pentelow – tenor saxophone (9)
 Pete Thomas – tenor saxophone (9)
 Rick Taylor – trombone (1, 3, 6, 9), horn arrangements (9)
 Chris Pyne – trombone (9)
 Raul D'Oliveira – trumpet (1, 3, 6, 9)
 Paul Spong – trumpet (1, 3, 6, 9)
 Sister Sledge – backing vocals (1)
 Alan Carvell – backing vocals (3, 5, 7–9)
 Kiki Dee – backing vocals (3, 5, 6, 8, 9)
 Katie Kissoon – backing vocals (3, 5, 6, 8, 9)
 Pete Wingfield – backing vocals (3, 5, 6–9)
 George Michael – backing vocals (4), featured vocals (6)
 Millie Jackson – lead and backing vocals (11)

Production 
 Produced by Gus Dudgeon
 All lyrics by Bernie Taupin
 Recorded by Stuart Epps
 Mixed and Edited by Graham Dickson and Gus Dudgeon
 Additional Mixing and Editing by Tom Pearce
 Mastered by Gordon Vicary at The Townhouse (London, UK).
 Design – David Larkham
 Photography – Terry O'Neill

Charts

Weekly charts

Year-end charts

Certifications

References

External links

Elton John albums
1985 albums
Albums produced by Gus Dudgeon
Geffen Records albums
The Rocket Record Company albums